Pyotr Ilyich Tchaikovsky (1840–1893) was a Russian composer.

Tchaikovsky or variant spellings may also refer to:
Tchaikovsky (surname), a Slavic surname (and list of people with the name)
Chaikovskij (crater), an impact crater on Mercury
Tchaikovsky (film), a 1969 Russian film
"Tchaikovsky" (The Americans), a 2018 episode of The Americans
"Tschaikowsky (and Other Russians)", an American patter song by Kurt Weill and Ira Gershwin and originally performed by Danny Kaye
Chaykovsky, Perm Krai, a town in Russia
Snezhinka (ski jumping venue) near Chaykovsky, Perm Krai
2266 Tchaikovsky, an outer-belt asteroid
Tchaikovsky Conservatory, a music school in Moscow, Russia
Tchaikovsky Symphony Orchestra

See also
Czajkowski
Chaykovsky (inhabited locality), a list of inhabited localities in Russia
Circle of Tchaikovsky, Russian revolutionary organization